The 2020 UCLA Bruins football team represented the University of California, Los Angeles during the 2020 NCAA Division I FBS football season. The team was led by third-year head coach Chip Kelly and competed as members of the Pac-12 Conference in the South Division.

On August 11, the Pac-12 Conference initially canceled all fall sports competitions due to the COVID-19 pandemic. On September 24, the conference announced that a six-game conference-only season would begin on November 6, with the Pac-12 Championship Game to be played December 18. Teams not selected for the championship game would be seeded to play a seventh game.

On December 17, with a 3–3 record and one game left to play, the program announced that they would decline any invitation to a bowl game. The Bruins lost their final game, finishing their season with a 3–4 record. The combined deficit in their four defeats was only 15 points, including a one-point loss to Stanford in double overtime, 48–47, in the season finale.

Overall on the season, the Bruins outscored their opponents by a total of 248 to 215.

Previous season
The Bruins finished 4–8 in 2019 and 4–5 in conference play, tying Arizona State for a third-place finish in the South Division.

Offseason

Position key

Offseason departures

Recruiting

Transfers

Returning starters

Impact of coronavirus pandemic
On August 5, 2020, the Los Angeles County Health Director announced that eight UCLA football players tested positive for COVID-19.

Preseason

Award watch lists

Pac-12 media days
The Preseason Media poll shows the Bruins at 4th place in the South Division.

Preseason All-Pac-12 teams

Personnel

Coaching staff
Head coach: Chip Kelly (New Hampshire '90) 3rd year
Defensive coordinator: Jerry Azzinaro 3rd year
Quarterbacks: Dana Bible 3rd year
Receivers: Jimmie Dougherty 4th year
Running backs: DeShaun Foster 4th year
Offensive coordinator / Off. Line: Justin Frye 3rd year
Outside linebackers: Jason Kaufusi 2nd year
Defensive line: Johnny Nansen 1st Year
Asst. head coach/passing game coord./ Defensive backs: Brian Norwood 1st year
Inside linebackers: Don Pellum 3rd year
Tight ends / Special teams: Derek Sage 3rd year
Director of football performance: Frank Wintrich 3rd year

Roster

Depth chart

Schedule
UCLA's 2020 regular season was announced on January 16. The Bruins had games scheduled against New Mexico State, Hawaii, and San Diego State, but canceled these games on July 10 due to the Pac-12 Conference's decision to play a conference-only schedule due to the COVID-19 pandemic.

On November 13, UCLA's scheduled home game against Utah was canceled after a COVID-19 outbreak within the Utah program. The same day, the Pac-12 announced UCLA would instead host California the morning of November 15; the Golden Bears' scheduled game at Arizona State had also been canceled after Arizona State had a COVID-19 outbreak. UCLA's game at Oregon was moved by a day to Saturday, November 21, to accommodate the other changes.

Game summaries

at Colorado

While UCLA attempted a valiant second-half comeback, their four turnovers in the first half proved too much to overcome and the Bruins were defeated, 48–42.

California

at Oregon

Arizona

Arizona State

USC

Stanford

Rankings
On December 6, UCLA received a vote in the AP Poll for the first time since 2017.

Players drafted into the NFL

Statistics

Awards and honors

  Associated Press 2020 All-Conference Team – Osa Odighizuwa (defensive tackle) and Demetric Felton (all-purpose), first team; Greg Dulcich (tight end), Caleb Johnson (linebacker), Felton (running back) second team
 Pac–12 2020 All-Conference Team – Osa Odighizuwa (first team); Greg Dulcich, Demetric Felton and Dorian Thompson-Robinson (second-team); Stephan Blaylock, Caleb Johnson, Qwuantrezz Knight, Sam Marrazzo and Kyle Philips (honorable mention)

References

UCLA
UCLA Bruins football seasons
UCLA Bruins football